This article outlines all individuals who have made at least 400 appearances in La Liga. Players in bold are still active in La Liga. Players in italics are still active outside La Liga.

List of players

References
Ranking at BDFútbol
Ranking at WorldFootball.net

 
Association football player non-biographical articles
Lists of association football players